Munshiram Manoharlal Publishers Pvt. Ltd. (MRML) is a leading publishing house located in New Delhi, India. Established in 1952 by Manohar Lal Jain, it is one of the oldest publishing houses in India.

About
MRML publishes books on social sciences and humanities and has published over 3000 academic and scholarly publications in Indian art, art history, architecture, archaeology, history, culture, politics, numismatics, geography, travel, voyages, Indian law, Indian medicine, language, literature, linguistics, dictionaries, glossaries, handbooks, indices, music, dance, theatre, religion, philosophy, Buddhism, Hinduism, Islam, Jainism, Sufism, Sikhism, tantra, mysticism, yoga, Sanskrit literature, sociology, anthropology, and related subjects.

MRML co-publishes scholarly titles with governmental institutions and bodies such as the Indian Council of Philosophical Research (ICPR); Centre for Studies in Civilizations, which is world-renowned for the series of scholarly publications called the Project of History of Science, Philosophy and Culture (PHISPC); Indira Gandhi National Centre for the Arts (IGNCA); and Indian Council of Historical Research (ICHR). In addition, MRML publishes and reprints books in collaboration with university presses, independent publishers, scholars, and institutions around the world.

History 
Munshiram Manoharlal belongs to a family of publishers who were the pioneers in Indological publishing in India. The origins of the family business can be traced back to 1870 in Lahore where books were published under the name of the ancestral company which was founded by Mehar Chand Jain. He named it Meharchand Lachhmandas. Mehar Chand Jain, a widely respected literary figure, had translated the Guru Granth Sahib, the holy book of the Sikhs, into English. Maharaja Ranjit Singh decorated him for his ground-breaking work. The company slowly expanded and its publications were being sold at premier bookstores all over the country.

Meharchand Lachhmandas was the first to publish several classic, essential, and perennial texts in the field of Indology, and became the premier Indological publisher with a long list of published titles. It had a vast collection of manuscripts and publications from around the world at its bookshops. Lahore was the centre of education at that time and the company's bookshops specialized in Indology. It flourished for three subsequent generations, i.e., Lachhman Das Jain, Munshi Ram Jain, and Manohar Lal Jain.

In 1947, just before the partition of India, the offices, press, bookstore, and residence were burned down by Muslim activists. Fortunately, the women and children of the family had been evacuated earlier to Amritsar. Soon afterwards, Manohar Lal Jain was forced to flee to Amritsar to take refuge, and was helped by Muslim neighbours who helped him escape safely across the border. The family was once again united, but with no business or assets.

After the partition of India, there was a split in the family business. Manohar Lal Jain separated from the parent company Meharchand Lachhmandas to set up his own bookselling and publishing company. In 1948, he sold the jewelry his wife had brought with her from Lahore, and with that money, steps were taken to re-establish the business. Since Manohar Lal Jain was a well-known publisher with an excellent reputation, it was not difficult for him to restart the business. His services to the literary world were recognized and the business flourished once again.

In 1952, Munshiram Manoharlal was founded as a bookselling and publishing company at Nai Sarak in Delhi. It soon gained popularity and respect and became a leading Indological publisher, bookseller, and library-supplier from India. Munshiram Manoharlal's publications, along with other publications from the Indian subcontinent, were now being marketed aggressively in the South Asian market and exported to countries all over the world.

Manohar Lal Jain died in 1988 due to cardiac arrest. Munshiram Manoharlal Publishers Pvt. Ltd. was run by his son, Ashok Jain, who passed away on 4 September 2021. It is now run by his wife, Shashi Jain and daughter, Madhuri Jain.

Bookstores 

MRML's head-office, principal bookstore, and distribution centre is located at 54 Rani Jhansi Road, New Delhi 110 055.

Publications 
MRML's publications include the following:

The Mahabharata of Krishna-Dwaipayana Vyasa, 12 volumes by Kisari Mohan Ganguli
The Astadhyayi of Panini, 6 volumes by Rama Nath Sharma
Yogavarttika of Vijnanabhiksu, 4 volumes by T. S. Rukmani
Yogasutrabhasyavivarana of Sankara, 2 volumes by T. S. Rukmani
History of Science, Philosophy and Culture in Indian Civilization, General Editor: D.P. Chattopadhyaya; over 100 volumes published so far
Manasara Series, 7 volumes by Prasanna Kumar Acharya
Ananda K. Coomaraswamy Series
A Source-book of Indian Archaeology, 3 volumes, edited by Frank Raymond Allchin and D. K. Chakrabarti
Complete Works of Goswami Tulsidas, 6 volumes, translated into English by S.P. Bahadur
Ramayana in Regional Languages Series, 3 volumes published so far, translated into English by Shanti Lal Nagar
Calukya Architecture, 3 volumes by Gerard Foekema
Concise History of Ancient India, 3 volumes by A.K. Majumdar
New History of the Marathas, 3 volumes by Govind Sakharam Sardesai
The Vedantasutras with the Sribhasya of Ramanujacarya, 3 volumes, translated into English by M.B. Varadaraja Aiyangar
A History of Sufism in India, 2 volumes by S.A.A. Rizvi
The Atharvaveda, The Samaveda, and the Yajurveda by Devi Chand
The Rigveda, The Atharvaveda, The Samaveda, and the Yajurveda by Ralph T. H. Griffith
Sangitaratnakara of Sarngadeva, 2 volumes published so far by R.K. Shringy and Prem Lata Sharma
An Encyclopaedia of Indian Archaeology, 2 volumes, edited by A. Ghosh
The Builders of Indian Philosophy Series, General Editor: R. Balasubramanian
History of the Sikhs, 5 volumes by Hari Ram Gupta
Ancient Indian Massage by Harish Johari
The Coins of the Indian Sultanates by Stan Goron and J.P. Goenka
Discourse in Early Buddhist Art: Visual Narratives of India by Vidya Dehejia
Slaves of the Lord: The Path of the Tamil Saints by Vidya Dehejia
The Buddha Image: Its Origin and Development by Y. Krishan
Kriya-yoga: The Science of Life-force by Swami Nityanandna Giri

References

External links 
 Munshiram Manoharlal website

Book publishing companies of India
Indology
Bookstores of India
Companies based in Delhi